General Enrique Godoy is a village and municipality in Río Negro Province in Argentina.

History
After the Conquest of the Desert, president Julio Argentino Roca gave his secretary, Manuel Marcos Zorilla, 15,000 hectares of the area that included the present General Enrique Godoy and Villa Regina, which he called "Campo Zorilla" (Zorrilla Field, or fox field). Part of the property was acquired by Spanish physician Avelino Gutiérrez and his mathematician son-in-law Julio Rey Pastor in 1920 for urban development. The train station was opened in 1924 and the town was named after an expeditioner of the Desert conquest.

Footnotes

References

Populated places in Río Negro Province